John Paul Fulbrook is an Australian politician. He has been a Labor Party member of the South Australian House of Assembly since the 2022 state election, representing Playford. Fulbrook holds an arts degree from Flinders University and a business degree from Edith Cowan University. Before entering parliament, he worked as an advisor to the Weatherill government and then to the Northern Territory government.

References 

Living people
Members of the South Australian House of Assembly
21st-century Australian politicians
Australian Labor Party members of the Parliament of South Australia
Year of birth missing (living people)